John Curteys may refer to:

John Curteys (MP for Marlborough) (fl. 1388–1395), carpenter and MP
John Curteys (MP for Lostwithiel) (fl. 1389–1413), MP and mayor of Lostwithiel

See also
John Curtis (disambiguation)